666 may refer to:

 666 (number)
 666 BC, a year
 AD 666, a year
 The number of the beast, a reference in the Book of Revelation in the New Testament

Places 
 666 Desdemona, a minor planet in the asteroid belt
 U.S. Route 666, an American highway now numbered U.S. Route 491
 666 Fifth Avenue, now 660th Fifth Avenue

Entertainment 
 666, a pornographic movie series by John Thompson Productions
 Wrestling of Darkness 666, a Japanese professional wrestling promotion
 666 ABC Canberra, an ABC Local Radio station based in Canberra
 666 Park Avenue, an American supernatural drama series

Music 
 666 (band), a German trance music group

Albums 
 SixSixSix
 666 (Aphrodite's Child album)
 6:66 Satan's Child, a 1999 album by Danzig
 666 (Hyde album), an album by the musician Hyde
 666 (Billy Talent album), a live album by Billy Talent
 6:6:6, a split CD between Smackin' Isaiah (a.k.a. A Wilhelm Scream), Moronique and Merrick

Songs 
 666, a song on the 1982 album Metal on Metal, by Anvil
 Six Six Six, a song on the 2014 album Hebrews, by Say Anything
 666, a song on the 2022 album G.I.N.A, by Amerado

Other uses 
 1980 Pennsylvania Lottery scandal, known as the "Triple Six Fix"
 Abajiri, an eschatological Christian sect in Uganda, also known as 666
 Themba Vilakazi (born 1981–1982), South African serial killer

See also 

 A666 road in Greater Manchester and Lancashire, England
 Hexakosioihexekontahexaphobia, fear of the number 666
 Old 666, a noted Boeing B-17E Flying Fortress heavy bomber of World War II
 Three 6 Mafia, an American hip-hop/rap group
 Damián 666 (born 1961), Mexican professional wrestler
 Bestia 666 (born 1989), Mexican professional wrestler